Seybouse (in ) is a river in northeastern Algeria, near the border with Tunisia. In Roman times, it was called the Ubus.

Course
It starts in Medjez Amar, in the Tell Atlas north-west of Guelma Province. Its flows into the Mediterranean Sea at Seybouse (called Joannonville under French rule) to the south-east of the city of Annaba. Its mouth is just north of Sidi Salem, the site of Hippo Regius where Saint Augustine lived in AD 391–430.

The Seybouse is used for irrigation of agricultural areas, but it is becoming polluted because of industrial activities.

Characteristics

References

External links
  ANRH (National Agency for Water Resources)
 Augustine in Algeria
 1902 Encyclopedia

Rivers of Algeria
Geography of Guelma Province
Geography of Annaba Province